The Hasely Crawford Stadium, formerly the National Stadium, is located in Port of Spain, Trinidad and Tobago. It was inaugurated and formally opened by Prime Minister George Chambers on 12 June 1982. On 30 December 1996, Prime Minister Basdeo Panday officially designated it "The Hasely Crawford Stadium", after the first person from Trinidad and Tobago to win an Olympic gold medal.

History
The stadium, which is sometimes used by the Trinidad and Tobago national football team, hosted the final of the 2001 FIFA U-17 World Championship. It also hosted games at the 2010 FIFA U-17 Women's World Cup.

Currently the stadium has a capacity of 22,575 with the installation of individual seats. However, on 19 November 1989 Trinidad and Tobago played the US in a winner takes all WC qualifying match in front of somewhere between 30,000 - 40,000 fans. Its theatre-style VIP Room holds 250.

References

Hasley Crawford Stadium  (sportt-tt.com)

External links
Panoramic image from the Trinidad and Tobago Computer Society

Buildings and structures in Port of Spain
Football venues in Trinidad and Tobago
Athletics (track and field) venues in Trinidad and Tobago
Trinidad
Sports venues completed in 1982
1982 establishments in Trinidad and Tobago